Pinal County is in the central part of the U.S. state of Arizona. According to the 2020 census, the population of the county was 425,264, making it Arizona's third-most populous county. The county seat is Florence. The county was founded in 1875.

Pinal County contains parts of the Tohono Oʼodham Nation, the Gila River Indian Community and the San Carlos Apache Indian Reservation, as well as all of the Ak-Chin Indian Community.

Pinal County is included in the Phoenix–Mesa–Scottsdale, Arizona Metropolitan Statistical Area. Suburban growth southward from greater Phoenix has begun to spread into the county's northern parts; similarly, growth northward from Tucson is spreading into the county's southern portions. Pinal County has five cities: Maricopa, Casa Grande, Apache Junction, Eloy, and Coolidge. There are also many unincorporated areas, which have shown accelerated growth patterns in recent years; such suburban development is likely to continue for the foreseeable future.

History
Pinal County was carved out of neighboring Maricopa County and Pima County on February 1, 1875, during the Eighth Legislature. In the August 18, 1899, issue of The Arizona Magazine, the name "Pinal" is said to come from the pine-clad Pinal Mountains. Pinal County was the second-fastest-growing county in the U.S. between 2000 and 2010.

In 2010, CNN Money named Pinal County as the second fastest growing county in the USA.

Geography

Mountain ranges

 Mineral Mountains
 Sacaton Mountains
 Superstition Mountains
 Waterman Mountains

Adjacent counties
 Maricopa County – west, north
 Gila County – north
 Graham County – east
 Pima County – south

Major highways

  Interstate 8
  Interstate 10
  U.S. Route 60
  Historic U.S. Route 80
  State Route 24
  State Route 77
  State Route 79
  State Route 84
  State Route 87
  State Route 177
  State Route 187
  State Route 238
  State Route 287
  State Route 347
  State Route 387
  State Route 587

National protected areas
 Casa Grande Ruins National Monument
 Coronado National Forest (part)
 Hohokam Pima National Monument
 Ironwood Forest National Monument (part)
 Sonoran Desert National Monument (part)
 Tonto National Forest (part)

Demographics

2000 census
As of the census of 2000, there were 179,727 people, 61,364 households, and 45,225 families living in the county. There were 81,154 housing units at an average density of 15/sq mi (6/km2). The racial makeup of the county was 70.4% White, 2.8% Black or African American, 7.8% Native American, 0.6% Asian, 0.1% Pacific Islander, 15.7% from other races, and 2.7% from two or more races. 29.9% of the population were Hispanic or Latino of any race. 21.9% reported speaking Spanish at home, while 1.4% speak O'odham and <0.1% speak Apache.

Of the 61,364 households 29.8% had children under the age of 18 living with them, 56.9% were married couples living together, 11.5% had a female householder with no husband present, and 26.3% were non-families. 21.1% of households were one person and 9.2% were one person aged 65 or older. The average household size was 2.68 and the average family size was 3.09.

The age distribution was 25.1% under the age of 18, 8.7% from 18 to 24, 27.3% from 25 to 44, 22.7% from 45 to 64, and 16.2% 65 or older. The median age was 37 years. For every 100 females, there were 114.2 males. For every 100 females age 18 and over, there were 117.0 males.

The median household income was $35,856 and the median family income was $39,548. Males had a median income of $31,544 versus $23,726 for females. The per capita income for the county was $16,025. About 12.1% of families and 16.9% of the population were below the poverty threshold, including 25.5% of those under age 18 and 8.7% of those age 65 or over.

2010 census
As of the census of 2010, there were 375,770 people, 125,590 households, and 92,157 families living in the county. The racial makeup of the county was 72.4% white, 5.6% American Indian, 4.6% black or African American, 1.7% Asian, 0.4% Pacific islander, 11.5% from other races, and 3.8% from two or more races. Those of Hispanic or Latino origin made up 28.5% of the population. In terms of ancestry, 16.9% were German, 10.6% were Irish, 9.5% were English, and 2.8% were American.

Of the 125,590 households, 37.0% had children under the age of 18 living with them, 55.8% were married couples living together, 11.7% had a female householder with no husband present, 26.6% were non-families, and 20.5% of households were made up of individuals. The average household size was 2.78 and the average family size was 3.21. The median age was 35.3 years.

The median household income was $51,310 and the median family income  was $56,299. Males had a median income of $45,082 versus $34,785 for females. The per capita income for the county was $21,716. About 10.1% of families and 13.5% of the population were below the poverty line, including 18.3% of those under age 18 and 7.6% of those age 65 or over.

Politics
During the 20th century, Pinal was very much a bellwether county in U.S. presidential elections, having supported the winning candidate in every election between Arizona's statehood in 1912 and 2004 except for that of 1968, when Hubert Humphrey won the county by 3.2 percentage points but lost to Richard M. Nixon. As a result of the urban sprawl from Phoenix spreading into the county, a major political reversal has taken place between it and neighboring Maricopa County since the turn of the millennium. Pinal voters now trend more Republican than traditionally conservative Maricopa County, and it has become a safely Republican county. Donald Trump carried the county by the second-largest margin for a Republican since statehood.

Government
Salaries for county elected officials are set by the Arizona Revised Statutes. All county elected officials except the Sheriff (Mark Lamb as of 2017) and the County Attorney make a salary of $63,800, along with county benefits and compulsory participation in the Arizona State Elected Official Retirement Plan.
In 2020, the Republican Party won complete control of the Board of Supervisors. In 2022, the Arizona Supreme Court deemed their Road Improvement Tax (passed in 2018) as illegal due to the tax only applied to purchases under $10,000.  In 2022, the county's elections department came under intense scrutiny following several mistakes in the primary election.  At the time, the Elections Department had only two full-time employees.  The Board of Supervisors found themselves being accused of not properly funding the Elections Department.

Economy

CoreCivic, while still known as Corrections Corporation of America, operated the privately owned Saguaro Correctional Center. located in Eloy in Pinal County, It is paid by the state of Hawaii to house the majority of Hawaii's male prison inmate population.

Communities

Cities
 Apache Junction (partially in Maricopa County)
 Casa Grande
 Coolidge
 Eloy
 Maricopa

Towns

 Florence (county seat)
 Kearny
 Mammoth
 Marana (mostly in Pima County)
 Queen Creek (partially in Maricopa County)
 Superior
 Winkelman (partially in Gila County)

Census-designated places

 Ak-Chin Village
 Arizona City
 Blackwater
 Cactus Forest
 Campo Bonito
 Casa Blanca
 Chuichu
 Dudleyville
 Gold Canyon
 Goodyear Village
 Kohatk
 Lower Santan Village
 Oracle
 Picacho
 Queen Valley
 Red Rock
 Sacate Village
 Sacaton
 Sacaton Flats Village
 Saddlebrooke
 San Manuel
 Santa Cruz
 San Tan Valley
 Stanfield
 Stotonic Village
 Sweet Water Village
 Tat Momoli
 Top-of-the-World (partially in Gila County)
 Upper Santan Village
 Vaiva Vo
 Wet Camp Village

Other unincorporated communities

 Arizola
 Bapchule
 Barkerville
 Burns
 Kelvin
 Randolph
 Ray Junction
 Reymert
 Riverside
 Santan

Ghost towns

 Adamsville
 Alma
 American Flag
 Cochran
 Copper Creek
 Goldfield
 Pinal City
 Ray
 Reymert
 Socaton Village
 Sonora
 Tiger

County population ranking
The population ranking of the following table is based on the 2020 census of Pinal County.
† county seat

See also

 National Register of Historic Places listings in Pinal County, Arizona

References

External links

 
 
 Pinal County Official Employment Site
 Casa Grande Valley Newspapers Inc.
 Pinal County Chamber

 
1875 establishments in Arizona Territory
Phoenix metropolitan area
Populated places established in 1875